Sanderstead North was a ward in the London Borough of Croydon, London in the United Kingdom, created in 1965 (although holding its first election in 1964), and abolished in 1978.

The ward was in the Croydon South constituency, one of the safest Conservative seats in London.

List of Councillors

Sanderstead North Election Results

1964

1968

1971

1974

References

Former wards of the London Borough of Croydon
1978 disestablishments in England